Tommy Ill is a Wellington, New Zealand based rapper. Tommy Ill is one man, Tom Young, though the live band has a revolving cast of members: Kelvin Neal, Buck Beauchamp, James Beavis and Brian Hainsworth. Tommy's music has a reputation for being quirky, witty and eclectic. Though Tommy Ill songs involve rapping, and hip-hop style beats and samples, he is more often seen playing with indie/electro acts than with hip-hop acts.

Studio albums

Extended plays

External links
  Official Website
  on Facebook

References

New Zealand hip hop groups